Atsuji (written: 厚次 or 貴嗣) is a masculine Japanese given name. Notable people with the name include:

, Japanese sport wrestler
, Japanese manga artist and character designer

Japanese masculine given names